Henry Whitney may refer to:

 Henry Clay Whitney (1831–1905), American lawyer
 Henry Martyn Whitney (1824–1904), early journalist in the Kingdom of Hawaii
 Henry Melville Whitney (1839–1923), Boston industrialist
 Hank Whitney (born 1939), American basketball player
 Henry Howard Whitney (1866–1949), United States military officer and spy

See also
 Henry Whitney Bellows (1814–1882), American clergyman
 Harry Whitney (disambiguation)